Camilla Rosatello and Sofia Shapatava are the defending champions, but Rosatello chose not to participate. 

Shapatava partnered alongside Ksenia Palkina, but lost in the final to Polina Monova and Chantal Škamlová, 6–4, 6–3.

Seeds

Draw

Draw

References
Main Draw

Ladies Open Hechingen - Doubles